The Paar is a river in Germany.

Paar may also refer to:

Paar (surname)
Paar (film), a 1984 Hindi film
Pittsburgh Action Against Rape, an organization devoted to issues of sexual violence

See also
Par (disambiguation)
Parr (disambiguation)